Baz Teehan (born 1982) is an Irish hurler who played as a midfielder at senior level for the Offaly county team.

Teehan joined the team during the 2001 National League and immediately became a regular member of the starting fifteen. During his inter-county playing days Offaly enjoyed little success and, apart from a National League (Division 2) winners' title, the Offaly team failed to land any honours in the championship. Teehan retired from inter-county hurling prior to the 2008 championship.

At club level Teehan is a Leinster winners' medalist and a five-time county club championship winners' medalist with Coolderry.

Teehan has been an Offaly hurling selector.

References

 

1982 births
Living people
Coolderry hurlers
Hurling selectors
Offaly inter-county hurlers